"Party" is a song recorded by Australian pop singer Christine Anu. It was released as the third single from her debut studio album, Stylin' Up (1995). The song debuted at number 98 on the Australian Singles Chart before peaking at number 20 in October 1995. It remains Anu's highest-charting single.

Track listings
Australian CD single (D904)
 "Party" (single) – 3:04
 "My Island Home" (single) – 3:51	
 "Party" (Handbag mix) – 3:18	
 "Party" (The Extended Handbag mix) – 6:55	
 "My Island Home" (The Chant mix) – 4:12	
 "My Island Home" (acapella) – 3:50	
 "Kulba Yaday" – 4:15

Charts

Weekly charts

Year-end charts

References

1994 songs
1995 singles
Christine Anu songs
Mushroom Records singles
Songs about parties
Songs written by Christine Anu
Songs written by David Bridie